Vladas Douksas Klimite (14 March 1933 – 23 November 2007) was an Uruguayan footballer. Douksas played in the Uruguayan and Argentine leagues during the 1950s and 1960s and played in a South American Championship-winning Uruguay team in 1959.

Biography
Douksas was born 1933 in Montevideo to Vaclav (originally Vaclovas) and Emilia (originally Emilija), both Lithuanian immigrants, and was brought up in the suburb of Capurro. The Lithuanian version of his name is Vladas Daukšas Klimaitis. His father had worked for a chemical company before opening a small shop of his own.

Playing career

Club
Douksas signed for Centro Atlético Fénix as a seventeen-year-old in 1950. In 1953 he transferred to Rampla Juniors where he played until 1959. In 1960 Douksas transferred to Independiente in Argentina where he won the Argentine league championship. On arriving back in Uruguay Douksas was signed by Nacional. At Nacional he played in the team that lost in the final of the Copa Libertadores to his former club Independiente. After his stint at Nacional Douksas was signed by Danubio. In 1967, he was lured back to Argentina by Colón. His stay at Colón was short however, as he became homesick. He returned to Uruguay and retired shortly afterwards.

International career
Douksas made his debut for the Uruguay national football team in March 1959. He played six games at the first 1959 South American Championship tournament, scoring three goals. Despite his efforts Uruguay finished six out of seven nations. He then played four matches on the Uruguay team that won in the second 1959 South American Championship Ecuador. Douksas played his final match for la Celeste in June 1966 having played 33 times, scoring three goals.

Honours

Club
Independiente
 Primera División Argentina: 1960

Nacional
 Copa Libertadores runner-up: 1964

International
Uruguay
 South American Championship: 1959 (2nd tournament)

References

External links
Career overview

1933 births
2007 deaths
Association football midfielders
Uruguayan footballers
Club Nacional de Football players
Uruguay international footballers
Uruguayan football managers
Uruguayan people of Lithuanian descent
Danubio F.C. players
Club Atlético Independiente footballers
Rampla Juniors players
Centro Atlético Fénix players
Expatriate footballers in Argentina
Uruguayan expatriate footballers
Uruguayan Primera División players
Argentine Primera División players
Copa América-winning players